Pope Park may refer to:

in the United States
(by state)
Pope Park (Sylvester, Georgia), a park in Sylvester, Georgia
Pope Park (Connecticut), an Olmstead Brothers-designed park
Pope John Paul II Park Reservation, in Neponset, Massachusetts, also known as Pope Park
Pope Park (Michigan), in Hamtramck and/or Detroit, Michigan
Pope Park (Fayetteville, North Carolina), a park in Cumberland County, North Carolina
Pope Park (Madison County, Tennessee)
Pope Park (Corpus Christi, Texas)

See also:
Mount Pope Provincial Park, in British Columbia, Canada